Samuel John Eggleston (11 November 1926 – 12 December 2001) was an English educationist and publisher. He was a professor and head of the Department of Education at Keele University from 1967 to 1984. He was a professor of education at the University of Warwick from 1985 to 1996, and he chaired the Department of Education there from 1985 to 1991. In 1983, he and Gillian Klein co-founded Trentham Books. He was the founding editor-in-chief of the peer-reviewed academic journal Mentoring & Tutoring: Partnership in Learning.

References

1926 births
2001 deaths
English educational theorists
People from Dorchester, Dorset
Academics of Loughborough University
Academics of the University of Leicester
Academics of Keele University
Academics of the University of Warwick
People educated at Hardenhuish School
Alumni of the London School of Economics
Alumni of University College London
English publishers (people)
Academic journal editors
20th-century English businesspeople